Pseudoplatystoma punctifer or spotted tiger shovelnose catfish is a species of long-whiskered catfish native to the Amazon basin, in Bolivia, Brazil, Colombia, Ecuador, Peru, and Venezuela. It is a commercially farmed species, and it is difficult to harvest as it appears to be highly selective with its diet and exhibits cannibalistic behaviors. Other behaviors and developmental patterns vary based on both diet as well as parental behaviors that influence the organisms development from the Larval stage. 

References 

Pimelodidae
Fish of Bolivia
Freshwater fish of Brazil
Freshwater fish of Colombia
Freshwater fish of Peru
Fish of Venezuela
Fish of the Amazon basin
Fish described in 1855